Quartier Latin International (QLI), or Quartier Latin, is a soukous band from the Democratic Republic of the Congo established in 1986.

Location
The band was formed in 1986 in Kinshasa). It plays in DR Congo and other African countries  and often tours in Europe and North America.

Overview
The band was founded by its leader, composer, guitarist, vocalist, dancer and entertainer, Koffi Olomide. The band performs both in Lingala and French. Since inception, the band has seen many members come and go, some more than once. Many former band members still maintain good relations with the band. A show commemorating the band's 30th anniversary took place on 16 November 2016. The chief organizer is Fally Ipupa, who left the band in 2006.

Group Member Musicians 
Singer/Singers
 Asso Ferrari - since 2002,2011,2018 
 Bapinces Leader - since 2006,2011,2022
 Omba Lipassa - since 2007 
 Cindy Le Coeur - since 2007
 Baby Azembi - since 2009,2019 
 Mayassé Mbongi - since 2010 
 Adou Manisa - since 2011,2019 
 JR Nkondia - since 2013 
 Saint Cowboy - since 2014 
 Erick Mwayila - since 2014 
 Lindalala Sprada - since 2014 
 BB Jitrois - since 2016 
 Abel De Charme - since 2016,2022
 Cabriolet Mpasa - since 2019 
 Narcisse Soleil - since 2019 
 Yannick Dindo - since 2019,2022
 Blana Mosaka - since 2022 
 Boby Ronaldinho - since 2022 
 Hervé De Lille - since 2022 

Animators
 Mukusa Ya Mbwa - since  2004,2016 
 Ordinateur Rodrigue - since 2009 
 La Montagne Muhemba - since 2018 

Guitarists/Bassists
 Rocky Blanchard Miantezolo (Basse) - since 1989,1998,2003 "Vice-Président" 
 Richard Kadima Bass (Basse) - since 2004,2017 
 Flash Mangili (Rythmic,Solo,Mi-Solo) - since 2010 
 Yannick Stockan (Mi-Solo,Solo) - since 2012,2017 
 Cobetox Bass (Basse) - since 2013 
 Volcan Nibe-Toba (Solo,Mi-Solo) - since 2013 "Conductor" 
 Glove Matuvanga (Mi-Solo,Solo, Rhythmic) - since 2013
 Zapo Accompagnero (Rythmic) - since 2014 
 Jonathan Makiese (Mi-Solo,Solo) - since 2014
 Davido Solo (Solo,Mi-Solo) - since 2017 
 Patrick Djicain Mwamba (Basse) - since 2019 

Drummers 
 Sclack Masamba - since 2008
 Suira Mundelu - since 2009 

Percussionists
 Olivier Epondo - since 2013 
 Kirikou Mbonda - since 2014 

Synthétizers 
 Verveck Kalonji - since 2014 
 Noël Sentestar - since 2015 

Dancers
 Mamie Itanzoma - since 2003, 2006,2011 "Deanery"
 Renate Biberon - since 2007, 2022
 Laurette Mbila – since 2008, 2022 
 Sofia Napopo - since 2012 "Leader" 
 Sarah Yenga - since 2014 
 Naomi La Belle - since 2017 
 Gloria - since 2017 
 Ida Bafanta - since 2017 
 Rachel Muya - since 2018 
 Judith Kusa - since 2018 
 Vicky - since 2018 
 Creta Kembi - since 2019 
 Mermeze Mayonnaise - since 2019 
 Facebook - since 2020 
 Divine - since 2020  

Dancer
 Landry Japonais - since 2005,2022

The Old Musicians  
Singer/Singers
 Mascot De Katalas, from 1986-1987
 Marie-Paul Kambulu, from 1986-1987
 Eldorado Claude, from 1986-1993
 Djunafa Makengele, from 1986-1992
 Aladji Makenga, from 1986-1994
 Texaba Elonga, from 1986-1992
 Laudy Demingongo Plus-Plus, from 1988-1993
 Anibo Panzu, from 1989-1991
 Suzuki Luzubu, from 1989-1998, Returned from 2006-2012
 Acouda Nzuzi, from 1991-1992
 Nana Sukali, from 1991-1993
 Willy Bula, from 1991-1997
 Chou Lay Evoloko, from 1993-1994
 Babia Ndonga Chokoro, from 1993-2001, Returned from 2003-2011 (Deceased)
 Modogo Abarambwa, from 1993-1999, Returned from 2005-2007
 Éric Tutsi, from 1993-2001, returned from 2003-2005, 2011-2013, 2014-2017
 Tusecoze Azuray, from 1993-1997
 Sckola Miel Whitney, from 1993-1994
 Sam Tshintu, from 1994-1999
 Thomas Lokofé, from 1995-1996
 Pompon Miyaké, from 1995-1996
 Biva Ray, from 1995-1999
 Bouro Mpela, from 1996-1999, Retour 2000-2004, 2006-2007, 2015-2016
 Mamale Tupac, from 1996-2001
 Depitsho Savanet, from 1998-2000
 JF Ifongé, from 1998-2000
 Jipson Butukondolo, from 1998-2008
 Roi-Soleil Wanga, from 1999-2007
 Jordan Kusa, from 1999-2005
 Sarbatino Batracien, from 1999-2001, returned from 2006-2008
 Arca Dinheiro, from 1999-2012
 Chikito Mutakatif, from 1999-2001
 Marcel Bakenda, from 1999-2000
 Christian Samba, from 1999-2000
 Spino Ladjatence, from 1999-2001
Fally Ipupa, from 1999-2006
 Mustapha Gianfranco, from 1999-2000
 Lola Mwana, from 1999-2003
 Bendo Son, from 1999-1999
 Bagain Baguino, from 1999-2000
 Paparazzi Toto, from 2000-2001 returned from 2002-2003
 Montana Kamenga, from 2000-2008
 Michaux Chamberton Dix, from 2000-2003
 Deo Brondo, from 2001-2004
 Junior Kingombe, from 2002-2006 returned 2007-2009
 Tonton Lay Evoloko, from 2003-2004
 Chella Mputu, from 2004-2008
 Mirage Supersonic, from 2004-2006 Return 2007-2008
 Ferré Gola, from 2005-2006
 Général TV5, from 2005-2013 (Du Group Quartier Latin Mineurs)
 DVD Mangani Valéry, from 2005-2008, Return from 2010-2014, 2015-2018 (Du Group Quartier Latin Mineurs)
 Zoé Bella, from 2006-2007
 De Campo, from 2006-2012
 Rolly Mayemba, from 2006-2007 (Du Group Quartier Latin Mineurs)
 Guelord Mon Ami, from 2006-2013 (Du Groupe Quartier Latin Mineurs)
 Scotty Pippen, from 2006-2008 (Du Groupe Quartier Latin Mineurs)
 Deplick Pomba, from 2006-2007 (Du Groupe Quartier Latin Mineurs)
 Arabe Youssouf, from 2006-2011 (Du Groupe Quartier Latin Mineurs)
 Pentagone, from 2006-2008 (Du Groupe Quartier Latin Mineurs)
 Niawu Ndoki, from 2006-2007 (Du Groupe Quartier Latin Mineurs)
 Pitshou Malela, from 2006-2008 (Du Groupe Quartier Latin Mineurs)
 Picharme Mpaka, from 2006-2007 (Du Group Quartier Latin Mineurs)
 Tony Ambrosio, from 2007-2008
 MJ 30, from 2007-2008
 Joss Diena, from 2007-2009
 Gabbana Tatshou, from 2007-2009
 Jitrois Galliano, from 2007-2010
 Edo Dollar, from 2008-2015
 Egesson Hormis, from 2008-2011
 Jimmy Adoli, from 2009-2010
 Prince, from 2009-2010
 Alitsheur Amouly, from 2010-2014
 Danny Kulé, from 2010-2014
 David Love, from 2011-2014
 Faboson Zouma, from 2011-2015
 Ronsard Kanza, from 2012-2014
 Zadio Multiplicateur, from 2014-2018
 Fabrizio Mayela, from 2014-2020
 Smoke Mamba, from 2014-2015
 Papa Kanza, from 2014-2017
 Chikito Makinu, from 2017-2018
 Animators : 
 Jean Louis Manzungidi, from 1988-1995 (deceased) 
 Bivens Rappason, from 1993-1998, Return from 2015 à 2016 
 Dolce Parabolique Somono, from 1995 à 1999 
 Mbochi Lipasa, from 1996 à 1999, Retour from 2005 à 2008
 CNN Alligator, from 1998 à 2001, Retour from 2003 à 2005 
 Bidjana Vangu, from 1999 à 2000 
 Océan Zibankulu, from 1999 à 2000 (Deceased) 
 John Scotch, from 2000 à 2001 
 Petit Reagan Chirac, from 2000 à 2001 (Deceased) 
 Molayi Magidi, from 2000 à 2001 
 Washington Libango, from 2000 à 2001, Retour from 2002 à 2004 
 Brigade Sarbaty, from 2001 à 2004, Retour from 2005 à 2006 
 Bébé Kerozene, from 2001 à 2003, Retour from 2004 à 2005 
 Acide Wanzambi, from 2003 à 2005 
 Apocalypse Mobuka, de 2003 à 2006, Retour de 2013 à 2015 
 Golbert Napoléon, de 2004 à 2006 
 Pépic Mbassu, de 2006 à 2009 (Du Groupe Quartier Latin Mineurs) 
 Mbuji Mayi, de 2006 à 2008 (du groupe Quartier Latin Mineurs) 
 Tourbillon Mbaka, de 2006 à 2009 (Du Groupe Quartier Latin Mineurs) 
 Gesac Tshipoyi, de 2007 à 2010 
 Ségolène Royal, de 2007 à 2008 (Du Groupe Quartier Latin Mineurs) 
 Rossignol Anerori, de 2009 à 2010 
 DVD Mokonzi, de 2009 à 2012 
 Abdoulaye Le Lion, de 2009 à 2016 
 Masamuna Fiston, de 2010 à 2011 
 Touareg Mushakarente, de 2010 à 2010 
 Equaliseur Boseko, de 2012 à 2013 
 Aspirine Atalaku, de 2012 à 2016 
 Petit Maniango, de 2013 à 2017 
 Rapison Atalaku, de 2013 à 2014 
 Kirikou Deo Kasololo, de 2016 à 2018 
 Bercy Muana, de 2021 à 2021

 Guitarists of Bassists : 
 Bobo Véron (Mi-Solo,Rythmique), de 1986 à 1991 
 Yoto Nkelani (Solo,Mi-solo), de 1986 à 1992 (Deceased) 
 Toussaint Vince (Rythmique,Mi-Solo, Solo), de 1986 à 1993 
 Fofo Le Collégien (Basse,Rythmique,Mi-Solo), de 1986 à 1990, Retour de 1999 à 2006 
 Djo Mass (Basse), de 1986 à 1992 
 Philo Bass (Basse), de 1987 à 1992 
 Do Akongo (Rythmique), de 1987 à 2000 
 Felly Tyson (Solo,Mi-Solo, Rythmique), de 1991 à 2011 
 Didace Iboula (Mi-Solo, Rythmique), de 1991 à 1994 
 Lebou Kabuya (Solo,Mi-Solo,Rythmique), de 1992 à 1999 , Retour de 2003 à 2005 (Deceased) 
 Beniko Popolipo (Mi-solo,Solo, Rythmique), de 1993 à 1997, retour de 1998 à 2000 
 Augusto Nsingi (Basse), de 1993 à 1995 
 Pathy Bass (Basse), de 1994 à 1999 
 Binda Bass (Basse), de 1995 à 2011 
 Ridens Makosso (Rythmique, Mi-Solo,Solo), de 1996 à 2002 
 Sunda Bass (Basse), de 1996 à 1998 (Deceased) 
 Jean-Marie Motingia (Basse), de 1997 à 1998 
 Deba Oneil (Rythmique), de 1999 à 2000 
 Clovis Silawuka Bass (Basse), de 1999 à 2000 
 Janvier Okota (Rythmique,Solo), de 1999 à 2000 
 Djodjo Mambu (Rythmique), de 2000 à 2017 (Décédé) 
 Ramazani Fulutini (Solo,Mi Solo), de 2000 à 2004 
 Poupa Mavambu Mystic (Mi-Solo, Solo, Rythmique), de 2001 à 2021
 Bourman Idolo (Rythmique), de 2003 à 2009 
 Mbetenge Domingo (Solo,Mi-Solo, Rythmique), de 2003 à 2011 
 Champion Vualu (Solo, Mi Solo), de 2006 à 2015 
 Hono Kapanga (Solo, Mi-Solo), de 2007 à 2010 
 Christian Schengen Xtian (Rythmique), de 2008 à 2010 
 Teddy Solo (Solo, Mi-Solo), de 2011 à 2016 
 Pas Dachis (Rythmique), de 2013 à 2018 
 Drummers : 
 Baguette Kinze, de 1986 à 1991 
 Trocadéro Mukusa, de 1988 à 1990 
 Coco Tchomba, de 1989 à 1997 
 Kaps Kapangala, de 1991 à 1995 
 Champion Djikapela Esthétique, de 1996 à 2001 Return de 2005 à 2008
 Tchétché De Balle, de 1997 à 2000 , Return de 2002 à 2010 
 Ilele Kambodje, de 2000 à 2003 
 Titina Alcapone, de 2001 à 2007 
 Lita Guelord, de 2009 à 2019 (Deceased) 
 Percussionnists: 
 Simolo Katondi, de 1986 à 1992 
 Nseka Kudiféléla Passé Kossé, de 1988 à 2014 
 Lady Mbonda, de 2005 à 2011 
 Papy Lukila, de 2011 à 2015 
 Synthétizers : 
 Inconnu Synthé, de 1988 à 1992 
 Eric Bamba, de 1993 à 1995 
 Ondoma Motema, de 1995 à 2001 (Deceased) 
 Christian Nzenze, de 2000 à 2001 
 Giresse Synthé, de 2002 à 2011 
 Theo Bidens, de 2003 à 2005 
 Brice Malonga, de 2004 à 2008 
 Valérie Synthé, de 2006 à 2007 
 Igor Synthé, de 2010 à 2015 
 Gongi : 
 Raul Le Mignon, de 2002 à 2015 
 Dancers Boys: 
 Tolin Shitokay, de 1986 à 1995 
 Tchétché De Balle, de 1995 à 1997 
 Tshotsholi Samara, de 1995 à 1996 
 Boketshu, de 1995 à 1996 
 Tomalin, de 1995 à 1996 

• Dancers Girls : 
 Rosette Kamono, de 1989 à 1995, return of 1997 à 1998 
 Mireille Kashama, de 1989 à 1990 
 Dorothée La Japonaise, de 1990 à 1992 
 Bichan Pitho, de 1990 à 1992 
 Fifi Miss Yolo, de 1990 à 1998 
 Floriane Mangenda, de 1991 à 1992 
 Jacky Bebeto, de 1991 à 1994 (Deceased) 
 Marie-Vincent Ekoundé, de 1991 à 1992 (Deceased)
 Ritha Dembo, de 1993 à 1996, return of 1999 à 2000 
 Chantal Niota, de 1993 à 1994 
 Zina Bilaho, de 1993 à 1999, return of 1999 à 2000 
 Mireille Kondé, de 1993 à 1998 (Deceased) 
 Solange Ekutshu, de 1994 à 1996, return of 1998 à 2001 (Deceased)
 Marie Mboyo, de 1994 à 1996 (Deceased) 
 Nono Ba Diamant, de 1995 à 1999 
 Miette Shégué, de 1995 à 1999 
 Claudine AC Milan, de 1996 à 2001 
 Youyou Tchivundu, de 1997 à 1999 
 Charlie Chocolat, de 1998 à 1999 
 Francine Bongongo, de 1999 à 2000 (Deceased)
 Nina, de 1999 à 2001 
 Godé Mujinga, de 1999 à 1999 (Décédée) 
 Fifi Kimbondonbo, de 1999 à 1999 (Décédée) 
 Bibi Sucre, de 1999 à 2001 
 Tina De Bandal, de 1999 à 2001 
 Irène Ba Beauté, de 1999 à 2000 
 Chouchou Mbayo, de 1999 à 2002, retour de 2003 à 2004, 2009 à 2013, 2016 à 2017 
 Blandine Korando, de 1999 à 2001 
 Patricia Baramoto, de 1999 à 2002 
 Spaghetti Vicky, de 1999 à 2002 (Décédée)
 Nana Mulenga, de 2000 à 2000 
 Sandra Lina Ba Beauté, de 2000 à 2002 
 Mave Manoka, de 2000 à 2001 
 Midi Kompressor, de 2000 à 2002 
 El-Bazoul Ba Whisky, de 2000 à 2001 
 Clara De Bruxelles, de 2000 à 2001 
 Patricia Champagne, de 2000 à 2001 
 Patience Ibembo, de 2000 à 2005, retour de 2006 à 2007 
 Clarisse, de 2000 à 2002 
 Maguy, de 2000 à 2002 
 Bijoux, de 2000 à 2001 
 Nadine Kuengita, de 2000 à 2002  
 Yéti Munieti, de 2000 à 2001, retour de 2003 à 2005 
 Monica Céleste, de 2001 à 2002 (Décédée) 
 Dolores, de 2001 à 2002 
 Bennie Musika, de 2001 à 2006 
 Bibicia Automatique, de 2001 à 2003, retour de 2005 à 2006, 2008 à 2009 
 Bijoux Anapata, de 2001 à 2003, retour de 2004 à 2005 
 Pamela Bengongo, de 2002 à 2008, retour de 2011 à 2017 
 Laura Mombili, de 2002 à 2003, retour de 2006 à 2007, 2013 à 2014 
 Kady Show, de 2002 à 2003 
 Françoise Marcation, de 2003 à 2006 
 Harmonie Tshindo, de 2004 à 2006 
 Nadège Bafanta, de 2004 à 2006 
 Miss Kadogo, de 2004 à 2005, retour de 2006 à 2007 
 Flore Lubaki, de 2004 à 2006 
 Pamela Nicaragua, de 2004 à 2005 
 Sandra Bakampa, de 2004 à 2005 
 Francine Sourire, de 2005 à 2007
 Stella, de 2005 à 2006   
 Bobette Bobby Brown, de 2006 à 2010 
 Fatou Disosologie, de 2006 à 2007
 Micheline États-Unis, de 2006 à 2007
  Nancy Dubaï, de 2006 à 2007
 Shekinah Musika, de 2006 à 2011
 Yolande Litalia, de 2006 à 2011 
 Flore Elengi, de 2007 à 2011 
 Blanche Kibala, de 2007 à 2008
 Patricia Apataki, de 2007 à 2009, retour de 2013 à 2017 
 Valérie Lito, de 2007 à 2013 
 Magalie Magastar, de 2007 à 2012 
 Miss Coulibaly, de 2007 à 2008
 Falonne, de 2007 à 2008
 Céleste Canon KK, de 2008 à 2008
 Jeannine Osonga, de 2008 à 2009
 Joly, de 2008 à 2009 
 Judith Songa, de 2008 à 2012 (Décédée) 
 Laeticia Leader, de 2008 à 2011 
 Patricia, de 2008 à 2012 
 Stéphanie Stéphie, de 2008 à 2012 
 Cuisse De Poulet, de 2009 à 2011
 Fatou LeCœur, de 2009 à 2013 
 Joyce, de 2009 à 2011
 Judith Tabu, de 2009 à 2011 
 Mina Gondi, de 2009 à 2009, retour de 2015 à 2016 
 Nadine Pepeka, de 2009 à 2011
 Fivette Mayamba, de 2010 à 2017 
 Nancy Muzitu, de 2010 à 2016
 Blandine Bilengi, de 2010 à 2011 
 Nina Vangu, de 2011 à 2015, retour de 2018 à 2020  
 Julie Mulanga, de 2011 à 2012 
 Lilas Metro, de 2013 à 2017
 Falonne Sifa, de 2014 à 2017, retour de 2019 à 2022
 Benedicte, de 2017 à 2021 
 Carmen Ngalula, de 2018 à 2021

References

Quartier Latin International
Musical groups established in 1986
Democratic Republic of the Congo musical groups